Sport Clube de Penalva do Castelo is a Portuguese sports club from Penalva do Castelo, Viseu District.

The men's football team played on the third tier until being relegated from the 2018–19 Campeonato de Portugal. The team notably reached the 2006–07 Taça de Portugal fifth round, later the 2012–13 Taça de Portugal fourth round.

References

Football clubs in Portugal
Viseu District
Association football clubs established in 1945
1945 establishments in Portugal